The Atlantic Geoscience Society (AGS), or Société Géoscientifique de l'Atlantique, is a scientific association for earth scientists working or interested in the Atlantic provinces. The membership comprises professional geologists in industry and academia, students, and interested members of the public. The society is affiliated with the Geological Association of Canada, the Canadian Society of Petroleum Geologists, and the American Association of Petroleum Geologists, and is a member of the Canadian Federation of Earth Sciences.

The society publishes the geological journal Atlantic Geology.

Recent presidents
The presidents since 2010:
 2010–2011: Grant Ferguson, Saint Francis Xavier University
 2011–2012: Jim Walker, Department of Natural Resources (New Brunswick)
 2012–2013: Elisabeth Kosters, Wolfville, Nova Scotia
 2013–2014: Grant Wach, Dalhousie University
 2014–2015: Cliff Stanley, Acadia University
 2015–2016: President: John Calder, Nova Scotia Department of Natural Resources
 2016–2017: Bob Grantham, Stewiacke
 2017–2018: Robin Adair, Zorayda Consulting Ltd.
 2018–2019: Lynn Dafoe, Geological Survey of Canada - Atlantic
 2019–2020: Martha Grantham, Stewiacke
 2020–2021: Dave Lentz, University of New Brunswick
 2021–2022: Anne Marie Ryan, Dalhousie University

Medals and awards
The Atlantic Geoscience Society recognizes geological contributions with two individual awards:
 Gesner Medal
 Laing Ferguson Distinguished Service Award

Achievements at its annual colloquium are recognized with other awards:
 Rob Raeside Award for Best Undergraduate Student Poster
 Graham Williams Award for Best Student Poster
 Sandra Barr Award for Best Graduate Oral Presentation
 Rupert MacNeill Award for Best Student Paper

References

Scientific organizations based in Canada
Geology societies